Anastasia Pavlyuchenkova was the two-time defending champion, having won the junior Australian Open titles in 2006 and 2007, but lost in the quarterfinals to Simona Halep.

Seeds

Draw

Finals

Top half

Section 1

Section 2

Bottom half

Section 3

Section 4

References

Girls' Singles
Australian Open, 2008 Girls' Singles